The 1999 Algerian Cup Final was the 35th final of the Algerian Cup. The final took place on July 1, 1999, at Stade 5 Juillet 1962 in Algiers with kick-off at 15:00. USM Alger beat JS Kabylie 2-0 to win their fourth Algerian Cup.

Algerian Ligue Professionnelle 1 clubs JS Kabylie and USM Alger was the teams that contested the final, in what was the 44th edition of the Kabylo-Algiers Derby. The competition winner was awarded a berth in the 2000 African Cup Winners' Cup.

Pre-match

Details

References

Cup
Algeria
Algerian Cup Finals
USM Alger matches